The 1990 Pacific Tigers football team represented the University of the Pacific (UOP) in the 1990 NCAA Division I-A football season as a member of the Big West Conference.

The team was led by head coach Walt Harris, in his second year, and played their home games at Stagg Memorial Stadium in Stockton, California. They finished the season with a record of four wins and seven losses (4–7, 2–5 Big West). The Tigers averaged over 30 points per game in 1990, but gave up almost 40 point per game. They were outscored by their opponents 353–411 over the season.

Schedule

References

Pacific
Pacific Tigers football seasons
Pacific Tigers football